Dieter-Klaus Hecking (born 12 September 1964) is a German football manager for 1. FC Nürnberg and former professional player. He played for Hannover 96 and Eintracht Braunschweig. He returned to manage Hannover despite the long-standing and bitter rivalry between the two clubs.

Managerial career

Early career (2000–2004)
On 1 July 2000, Hecking moved into management as he took over as manager at Regionalliga Nord outfit SC Verl. His first match was a 2–0 loss to Eintracht Braunschweig on 1 August 2000. However, Hecking's proclamations that he was seeking a new position irked the club to such an extent they fired him after just 20 games in charge. He was sacked on 31 January 2001. His final match was a 2–1 win to Tennis Borussia Berlin. Verl were in seventh place when Hecking was sacked.

Hecking wasn't free for long as another Regionalliga Nord side, VfB Lübeck, came calling on 27 March 2001. His first match was a 1–0 loss to Fortuna Düsseldorf on 30 March 2001. Hecking achieved a solid job in the remaining games, leaving the club in third place, just one short of promotion. This set the basis for the following season as the team claimed the title and moved up into the 2. Bundesliga. Lübeck were knocked out of the German Cup by Werder Bremen. Hecking then managed to secure Lübeck an 11th place in the 2002–03 season. Lübeck were knocked out of the German Cup by MSV Duisburg. The following season proved to have mixed results. In the league, the club slipped back down to the Regionalliga Nord, occupying the final relegation position. However, they also got to the semi-finals of the German Cup, where they were eliminated by Werder Bremen. This proved the catalyst for VfB Lübeck to announce that they would not be extending his contract further and he left the club on 25 May 2004.

Alemannia Aachen (2004–2006)
Once again, Hecking was not short of work as just a week later 2. Bundesliga side Alemannia Aachen announced that he would be taking the managerial reins at their club, after the departure of Jörg Berger.

Hecking's first match was a 1–1 draw against Eintracht Frankfurt on 9 August 2004. During the 2004–05 season, Alemannia Aachen participated in the UEFA Cup, where they got to second round when they eliminated by AZ Alkmaar. In the German Cup, Alemannia Aachen were eliminated in the second round by Bayern Munich. In the league, Alemannia Aachen finished in sixth place. The 2005–06 season started with a 2–1 loss to Erzgebirge Aue on 8 August 2005. Hannover 96 eliminated Alemannia Aachen in the second round of the German Cup. Alemannia Aachen finished second in the 2. Bundesliga and was promoted to the Bundesliga.

Hecking's time guiding Alemannia Aachen in the top flight was short. Just three games in, he requested to be able to leave the club for his former club and fellow Bundesliga side Hannover 96 on 7 September 2006, to fill the vacancy left by their sacking of Peter Neururer. Ironically, the final straw for Neururer was a 0–3 home defeat to Hecking's Alemannia Aachen. Alemannia Aachen were in 14th place when Hecking left the club. Hecking finished with a record of 42 wins, 14 draws, and 27 losses in 82 matches.

Hannover 96 (2006–2009)
Hecking became manager on 7 September 2006. Dieter Hecking officially took over the manager's job with immediate effect on 7 September 2006. However, caretaker manager Michael Schjönberg managed the DFB-Pokal match against Dynamo Dresden on 9 September 2006. Hecking recovered Hannover from a dismal start that left them bottom at the time of his arrival. The team also achieved a good run through to the quarter finals of the German Cup, and finished comfortably in 11th place in the Bundesliga. During the following season, Hanover were knocked out of the German Cup in the second round by Schalke 04. Hannover improved on their league position by finishing in eighth place. Hannover started the 2008–09 season with a 5–0 win against Hallescher FC on 9 August 2008. They were eventually eliminated in the second round by Schalke, for the second consecutive year. Hannover defeated Borussia Mönchengladbach 5–1 on 14 September 2008. The following week, on 19 September 2008, Hannover lost to Bayer Leverkusen 4–0. Hannover lost to 1899 Hoffenheim 5–2 on 18 October 2008. Hannover lost 4–0 to Eintracht Frankfurt on 22 November 2008. The match against VfB Stuttgart on 14 February 2009 finished in a 3–3 draw. Hannover lost to Bayern Munich 5–1 on 7 March 2009. The match against Borussia Dortmund on 14 March 2009 finished in a 4–4 draw. Hannover lost to Wolfsburg 5–0 on 16 May 2009. Hannover finished the 2008–09 season in 11th place. On 19 August 2009 Hecking resigned voluntarily from his post after a disappointing 2008–09 season and a slow start to the 2009–10 season. Hecking's final match was a 1–1 draw against Mainz. Hannover were tied for 14th place with 1899 Hoffenheim when Hecking left the club. Hecking finished with a record of 39 wins, 30 draws, and 40 losses in 109 matches.

1. FC Nürnberg (2009–2012)
On 22 December 2009, he was named as the new manager of 1. FC Nürnberg, replacing Michael Oenning. His first match was a 1–0 loss to Schalke on 17 January 2010. Nürnberg finished in 16th place and went into the relegation playoff. Nürnberg won both legs of the relegation playoff. During the 2010–11 season, Nürnberg reached the quarter-finals of the German Cup, where they were eliminated by Schalke. Nürnberg finished in sixth place in the league. They had finished one spot and 11 points behind Mainz for a Europa League spot. Nürnberg started the 2011–12 season with a 5–1 win against Arminia Bielefeld in the German Cup. They were eventually eliminated in the round of 16. Nürnberg finished in 10th place in the league. Hecking used a clause in his contract to leave the club. His final match was a 1–1 draw against Werder Bremen on 16 December 2012. Nürnberg were in 14th place when Hecking left the club. Hecking finished with a record of 42 wins, 23 draws, and 47 losses in 112 matches.

VfL Wolfsburg (2012–2016)

Hecking became manager of Wolfsburg on 22 December 2012. He made his debut on 19 January 2013 in a 2–0 win against Stuttgart. During the 2012–13 season, Wolfsburg lost to Bayern Munich twice. Wolfsburg lost to Bayern 2–0 in the league on 15 February 2013 and 6–1 in the German Cup on 16 April 2013. Wolfsburg finished in 11th place. Wolfsburg started the 2013–14 season with a 3–1 win against Karlsruher SC. Wolfsburg again got to the semi-finals of the German Cup. This time losing to Borussia Dortmund. Wolfsburg finished the season in fifth place and won a spot in the Europa League. Wolfsburg started the 2014–15 season by knocking out SV Darmstadt 98. The match finished in a 0–0 draw before Wolfsburg defeated Darmstadt in a shootout. Wolfsburg started the league season with a 2–1 loss to Bayern Munich. However, in the reverse fixture, Wolfsburg won 4–1. In March 2015, in the Europa League, in the round of 16, Wolfsburg defeated Inter Milan by a 3–1 score in the first leg and 2–1 in the second leg for a 5–2 aggregate score. Wolfsburg were eliminated by Napoli. Wolfsburg finished the league season in second place, 10 points behind Bayern. The second-place finish qualified Wolfsburg for the Champions League. On 30 May 2015 Wolfsburg defeated Borussia Dortmund 3–1 in the German Cup final. This was Hecking's first major trophy. Wolfsburg started the 2015–16 season by defeating Bayern Munich in a shootout to win the German Super Cup. In the Champions League, Wolfsburg won Group B, finishing two points above PSV Eindhoven. Wolfsburg were eventually eliminated by Real Madrid in the quarter-finals. Wolfsburg finished the league season in eighth place. Wolfsburg sacked Hecking on 17 October 2016. Hecking's final match was a 1–0 loss to RB Leipzig. Wolfsburg were in 14th place when Wolfsburg sacked Hecking. Hecking finished with a record of 81 wins, 41 draws, and 43 losses in 165 matches.

Borussia Mönchengladbach (2016–2019)
On 21 December 2016, Hecking was appointed as the new head coach by Borussia Mönchengladbach with a contract spanning until 2019. On 2 April 2019, Gladbach's sporting director Max Eberl announced that Hecking's term would not be extended beyond the end of the 2018–19 season.

Hamburger SV (2019–2020)
On 29 May 2019, Hecking signed a one-year contract to be the new manager of Hamburger SV, replacing Hannes Wolf. He departed by mutual consent on 4 July 2020.

Return to Nürnberg (2023–)
In February 2023, he took the head coaching spot on interim until the end of the 2022–23 seasn.

Managerial statistics

Honours

Manager
VfB Lübeck 
 Regionalliga Nord: 2001–02 (Promotion to 2. Bundesliga)
 Schleswig-Holstein Cup: 2001

Alemannia Aachen 
 2. Bundesliga promotion: 2005–06

VfL Wolfsburg
 DFB-Pokal: 2014–15
 DFL-Supercup: 2015

Individual
 German Football Manager of the Year: 2015

References

External links

Dieter Hecking at KSV Hessen Kassel Archive 
Dieter Hecking at kicker.de 

1964 births
Living people
People from Castrop-Rauxel
Sportspeople from Münster (region)
German footballers
Association football midfielders
Germany under-21 international footballers
Bundesliga players
2. Bundesliga players
Borussia Mönchengladbach players
SV Waldhof Mannheim players
1. FC Lokomotive Leipzig players
Hannover 96 players
Eintracht Braunschweig players
KSV Hessen Kassel players
German football managers
Bundesliga managers
2. Bundesliga managers
SC Verl managers
VfB Lübeck managers
Alemannia Aachen managers
Hannover 96 managers
1. FC Nürnberg managers
VfL Wolfsburg managers
Borussia Mönchengladbach managers
Hamburger SV managers
Footballers from North Rhine-Westphalia
West German footballers